Schuylkill may refer to:

Places
 Schuylkill, Philadelphia, neighborhood in South Philadelphia
 Schuylkill County, Pennsylvania
 Schuylkill Expressway, portion of I-76 in Philadelphia
 Schuylkill Gap, water gap through Blue Mountain in Pennsylvania
 Schuylkill Parkway, Pennsylvania Route 23
 Schuylkill River, a river in Pennsylvania
 Schuylkill River Bridge on the Pennsylvania Turnpike
 Schuylkill River Park, Philadelphia
 Schuylkill River Trail
 Schuylkill Township, Chester County, Pennsylvania
 Schuylkill Township, Schuylkill County, Pennsylvania

Other
 Le Schuylkill, a high-rise residential building in Monaco
 Schuylkill Branch, rail line in Pennsylvania
 Schuylkill and Susquehanna Navigation Company, (1791-1811) navigation system connecting the rivers
 Schuylkill Canal, (1815-1931) navigation system along the river from Port Carbon to Philadelphia, Pennsylvania
 Schuylkill College, now Albright College, Reading, Pennsylvania
 Schuylkill Institute of Business and Technology, Pottsville, Pennsylvania
 Schuylkill Mall, Frackville, Pennsylvania
 Schuylkill Regional Medical Center, Pottsville, Pennsylvania
 Schuylkill River, Pennsylvania, United States
 USS Schuylkill (AO-76)
 a train operated by Amtrak as part of the Clocker (train) service

See also
 Schuylkill Haven, Pennsylvania, borough in Schuylkill County
 Schuylkill Valley School District, Berks County, Pennsylvania
 Southwest Schuylkill, neighborhood in Philadelphia, Pennsylvania